Jangrot  is a village in the administrative district of Gmina Trzyciąż, within Olkusz County, Lesser Poland Voivodeship, in southern Poland.

References

Jangrot